Wilfred Gerald 'Wilfy' Rebimbus (2 April 1942 – 9 March 2010) was a Mangalorean singer, songwriter, lyricist and playwright famed for his Konkani and Tulu language compositions. He is popularly nicknamed as the Konkan Kogul meaning cuckoo (songbird) of the Konkan.

Early life and family
Hailing from a Mangalorean Catholic family, Wilfy was born on 2 April 1942 to Landeline Rebimbus and Magdeline Mendonca in Mangalore. His father was from Kanhangad in Kerala and mother was from Goa.

Wilfy had his primary and high school education at Milagres High School in Mangalore, currently Mangaluru. Later, he did a mechanical course before joining St Joseph's Workshop as an apprentice.

Early years and talent
He was a talented singer right since his student days, as was evident from the numerous prizes he had won in various singing events.

He had started composing Konkani songs at the age of 14 and authored his first drama Poixeancho Sonvsar (The World of Money) when he was 15 and staged it through the St. Joseph's Natak Sangh.

He founded the musical group called United Youngsters Music Party in 1959 when he was just 17. It is now known as United Youngsters Cultural Association.

Other activities
Apart from singing, Wilfy was also a good athlete and also a Kabaddi player during his school days.

Creative output
He was credited for taking modern Konkani music to new heights with his unique compositions and singing style. He wrote songs for numerous occasions and situations. In a career spanning about four decades, Wilfy wrote thousands of songs and staged a total of 248 Wilfy Nites.

He released some forty albums, six devotional albums and at least one instrumental album.

His poetry works comprise Vinchnar Podam (nine volumes), Kogull Gaita (two volumes), and audio cassettes and albums (47 in all).

On his 60th birthday in 2002, a third edition of a collection of songs written by Wilfy Rebimbus, called Kogul Gautha (The Koel Sings) was scheduled for release, together with a special edition of Poinnari, a weekly that dedicated an issue to Rebimbus. The singer composed his first song in 1952, wrote a stage play in 1958, and performed his first music show in 1971. His 100th show came about in 1989 and his 200th in 199. He was credited with having written 2500 songs, produced 33 audio cassettes, and six volumes of devotional songs, besides composing music and songs for Konkani movies, as of 2002. He wrote nine plays, some of which were broadcast over All India Radio's Mangalore station.

Konkan Kogul title
He was given the title Konkan Kogul by the Bishop of Mangalore at that time, the Late Basil D’Souza on 26 September 1971.

Awards and praise
Mandd Sobhann, a Mangalore-based Konkani cultural organisation, announced in 2009, that it would confer the Konakani music lifetime achievement award to Rebimbus "for his unparalleled contribution to Konkani music."

Former Karnataka chief minister and ex-union minister Veerappa Moily has described Rebimbus thus: "His talent is uncomparable; his legacy is unparallel[ed]. Rebimbus is undoubtedly an epochmaker."

A singing contest has been held in his name, including in the year 2013.

Research work based on artiste
Antony Mavrel Lobo of Christ University, Bangalore, has done a thesis in July 2019 on Representation of Konkani music and culture through the works of Wilfy Rebimbus.  In it, he argues that "according to the research conducted by Konkani Sahithya Academy, in Mangalore there are 42 dialects of Konkani, where people speak the same language using a few different words in the state of Karnataka."

Meena Gracia Rebimbus
He married Meena Gracia Rebimbus, who is also a popular singer, on 25 January 1970. She was given the title of Konkan Myna, named after another popular singing bird, by Benar Productions on 12 August 1984 for her melodious voice.

Meena Gracias Rebimbus has also composed few songs in Wilfy's albums namely, Nach to ka Vetha, Asha and Kuhu Kuhu which was a tribute to Wilfy after his death.

Family life
Wilfy and Meena together have two children, the elder being Veena Rebimbus Pais and the younger Vishwas Rebimbus. They also sing and compose music, and have continued their father's legacy by releasing an album in 2011 Tum Maka Hav Tuka.

On 13 June 2010, Bishop Dr. Aloysius Paul D’Souza conferred the title Pro Ecclesia Et Pontifice awarded by Pope Benedict XVI on Konkan Kogul Wilfy Rebimbus posthumously during the Mass held at the prominent Milagres Church of Mangalore. The special honour has been given to Wilfy for his love towards Church and his extraordinary musical contributions to the Konkani community worldwide. The bishop handed over the title to Meena Rebimbus.

Illness and death
Wilfy was diagnosed to be suffering from lung cancer and underwent a surgery in September 2009.

He died of complications from lung cancer on 9 March 2010. After his death at the age of 67, his mortal remains were kept for public viewing at the St. Joseph's Seminary Church at Jeppu in Mangaluru on March 11, 2010. He was buried at the Jeppu Cemetery. He was survived by his wife Meena, daughter Veena, son-in-law Arthur, son, Vishwas, daughter-in-law Charlene, and grandchildren Arvin and Anna.

References

External links
 Wilfy Rebimbus: Songs and videos of Wilfy Rebimbus
 Adeus Moga by Wilfy Rebimbus
 279th Wilfy Nite, Sukh Dukh Express, Part 1
 279th Wilfy Nite, Sukh Dukh Express, Part 2
 Wilfy Rebimbus, Konkani songs on SoundCloud.com
 Wilfy Remimbus on Facebook
 Wilfy Rebimbus on Humgama.Com
 Wilfy Rebimbus on Chordify.Net
 Annual memorial in 2011
 Wilfy Rebimbus quiz

1942 births
2010 deaths
Indian male folk singers
Indian Roman Catholics
Konkani-language singers
Mangaloreans
Deaths from lung cancer in India
20th-century Indian singers
Musicians from Mangalore
Singers from Karnataka
20th-century Indian male singers